William Shirley Collins (March 27, 1882 – June 26, 1961) was an outfielder in Major League Baseball.

On October 6, 1910, while playing for the Boston Doves against the Philadelphia Phillies, Collins became the first major league player to hit for the natural cycle (a single, double, triple, and home run, in that order).

In 228 games over four seasons, Collins posted a .224 batting average (173-for-773) with 91 runs, 3 home runs, 54 RBIs, 42 stolen bases and 54 bases on balls. He finished his career with an overall .967 fielding percentage playing at all three outfield positions.

See also
 List of Major League Baseball players to hit for the cycle

References

External links
, or Retrosheet

1882 births
1961 deaths
Boston Doves players
Boston Rustlers players
Chicago Cubs players
Brooklyn Dodgers players
Buffalo Buffeds players
Major League Baseball left fielders
Baseball players from Indiana
Sharon Giants players
Cedar Rapids Rabbits players
Bloomington Bloomers players
Newark Indians players
People from Chesterton, Indiana
Clear Lake Rabbits players